The checker shadow illusion is an optical illusion published by Edward H. Adelson, professor of vision science at MIT in 1995.

Description 
The image depicts a checkerboard with light and dark squares, partly shadowed by another object. The optical illusion is that the area labeled A appears to be a darker color than the area labeled B. However, within the context of the two-dimensional image, they are of identical brightness, i.e., they would be printed with identical mixtures of ink, or displayed on a screen with pixels of identical color.

Related illusions 
Whilst being one of the most well-known contrast illusions, there are similar effects which cause two regions of identical color to appear differently depending on context:
 The Cornsweet illusion creates a boundary between two identically-shaded regions with a discontinuous gradient, resulting in the opposing sides appearing to be different.
 The Chubb illusion evokes this effect by surrounding zones with others of different, distinct shades, with the relative brightness or darkness of the surrounded area appearing different.
 An illusion closely related to the checker shadow illusion, which also relies on using implied visual shadows to seemingly darken a brighter region to the same color as a well-lit dark region, involves two squares placed at an angle, with the darker square being lit and the lighter square at an angle which receives poor light.

See also 
 Psychophysics
 Color constancy
 The dress

References

External links 
 A high resolution remake of the illusion
 Real-life Proof
 Explanation of the effect
 Illusion of colors – search for ‘simultaneous brightness contrast’
 An interactive presentation of the effect
 An interactive click-and-drag demonstration of the effect

Optical illusions